Beccarii, a specific epithet honouring Italian botanist Odoardo Beccari, may refer to:

Plants
Aglaia beccarii, a tree in the family Meliaceae
Aulandra beccarii, a tree in the family Sapotaceae
Bulbophyllum beccarii, an orchid in the family Orchidaceae
Dacrydium beccarii, a conifer in the family Podocarpaceae
Dryobalanops beccarii or Kapur Keladan, a tree in the family Dipterocarpaceae
Haplolobus beccarii, a plant in the family Burseraceae
Holochlamys beccarii, a plant in the family Araceae
Musa beccarii, a wild banana in the family Musaceae
Myrmecodia beccarii, a plant in the family Rubiaceae
Palaquium beccarianum, a tree in the family Sapotaceae

Animals
Acanthopelma beccarii, a tarantula
Clinidium beccarii, a ground beetle in the family Carabidae
Cochoa beccarii, a bird in the family Turdidae
Conraua beccarii, a frog in the family Ranidae
Crocidura beccarii, a shrew in the family Soricidae
Emballonura beccarii, a bat in the family Emballonuridae 
Gallicolumba beccarii, a bird in the family Columbidae
Margaretamys beccarii, a rat in the family Muridae
Mormopterus beccarii, a bat in the family Molossidae
Otus beccarii, an owl in the family Strigidae
Scopula beccarii, a moth in the family Geometridae
Sericornis beccarii, a bird in the family Acanthizidae
Varanus beccarii, a monitor lizard in the family Varanidae